Philip Dearmond Curtin (May 22, 1922 – June 4, 2009) was a Professor Emeritus of Johns Hopkins University and historian on Africa and the Atlantic slave trade. His most famous work, The Atlantic Slave Trade: A Census (1969) was one of the first estimates of the number of slaves transported across the Atlantic Ocean between the 16th century and 1870, yielding an estimate of 9,566,000 African slaves imported to the Americas.  ( Current estimates are that about 12 million to 12.8 million Africans were shipped across the Atlantic over a span of 400 years.) He also wrote about how many Africans were taken and from what location, how many died during the middle passage, how many actually arrived in the Americas, and to what colonies/countries they were imported. Deirdre McCloskey has described Curtin as the "doyen of African economic historians."

Biography

Early life and education
Curtin was born in Philadelphia on May 22, 1922, and grew up in Webster Springs, West Virginia, the site of a coal and timber company owned by his family. He attended Swarthmore College, where he was awarded a Bachelor of Arts degree during 1948, having had an interruption of three years while he served in the United States Merchant Marine during World War II, serving aboard ship as a radio operator. He did his graduate work at Harvard University, earning a Master of Arts degree during 1949 and was awarded his Ph.D. during 1953. His doctoral dissertation, titled "Revolution and Decline in Jamaica, 1830–1865" addressed 19th-century history and economics of Jamaica.

Academic career
After graduation, he began teaching at Swarthmore College where he remained until 1956. He relocated to the University of Wisconsin–Madison where he taught from 1956 through 1975. There, Curtin and fellow historian Jan Vansina established a department of African languages and literature during 1956, as part of one of the first academic African studies programs established at a college in the United States. From 1975 until the time of his death he was a member of the faculty of Johns Hopkins University .

Recognized during 1983 as a MacArthur Fellow with its accompanying "genius grant", Curtin published a total of 19 books, which include Death by Migration: Europe's Encounter with the Tropical World in the Nineteenth Century, described by the American Historical Review (AHR) as "ground-breaking." In addition to the aforementioned calculation, he has challenged the common opinion that improvements of medicine were responsible for the increased attempts at European colonization of Africa during the 19th century.

In his 1969 book The Atlantic Slave Trade: A Census, Curtin researched the sources of frequently used estimates of the number of individuals transported across the Atlantic Ocean by the slave trade.  His analysis of shipping contracts and data from the ports of entry enabled him to estimate between 9 and 10 million individuals being transported on slave ships, with a margin of error of 20%, out of the 20 to 30 million that had been loaded aboard at ports in Africa. Prior to Curtin's research, estimates of the number of individuals brought from Africa as slaves ranged from 3.5 million to numbers as high as 100 million individuals. A widely cited number of 15 million slaves used by W. E. B. Du Bois, who had gotten the number from abolitionist Edward Dunbar. Another widely quoted estimate of 20 million slaves was based on calculations using data concerning slaves in Jamaica that was adjusted for the entire Atlantic slave trade, though the original data used to make the calculations has since been lost.

His 1989 book Death by Migration combined medical and population history, tracing the effects of tropical diseases on Europeans in tropical Africa during the time before medicines were available to treat these conditions effectively.

A controversial opinion piece published in a 1995 issue of The Chronicle of Higher Education titled "Ghettoizing African History" criticized the frequent equation of African and African American scholars in college and university departments of history with jobs concerning the history of Africa.  Although Curtin mentioned that this practice might discourage some caucasian academicians from specializing in African studies, his comments were also an argument for more opportunities for African-American scholars.

While many visitors to Africa have been to Gorée Island in Senegal, described as a site where as many as 20 million Africans were fattened for shipment across the Atlantic Ocean from the Slave House after being shackled there in dank cells, Curtin debunked the traditional account, stating that "[t]he whole story is phony". Curtin stated that the Slave House, one of the most beautiful houses on the island, would not have been used for storing slaves, that the rocks near the shore would make docking boats perilous and estimated that a total of no more than 50,000 slaves had passed through the island. Senegalese academics criticized Curtin's statement, stating that he was guilty of "stealing their history".

Books:
 Africa Remembered: Narratives by West Africans from the Era of the Slave Trade (editor, 1967)
 The Atlantic Slave Trade: A Census (1969)
 The Image of Africa: British Ideas and Action, 1780–1850 (1973, AHA Schuyler Prize)
 Africa and the West: Intellectual Responses to European Culture (1974)
 Precolonial African History (1975, AHA pamphlet)
 Economic Change in Precolonial Africa: Senegambia in the Era of the Slave Trade (1975)
 African History (co-author, 1978)
 Cross-Cultural Trade in World History (1984)
 Death by Migration: Europe’s Encounter with the Tropical World in the Nineteenth Century (1989)
 The Rise and Fall of the Plantation Complex: Essays in Atlantic History (1990)
 The Tropical Atlantic in the Age of the Slave Trade (1991, AHA pamphlet)
 Why People Move: Migration in African History (1995)
 Disease and Empire (1998)
 Migration and Mortality in Africa and the Atlantic World, 1700–1900 (2001)
 The World and the West (2002)
 On the Fringes of History: A Memoir (2005)

Doctoral Supervision (University of Wisconsin-Madison):

Doctoral Supervision (Johns Hopkins University):

Awards and honors 
Curtin was elected to the American Philosophical Society in 1995.

Personal
A resident of Kennett Square, Pennsylvania, Curtin died at age 87 on June 4, 2009, in West Chester, Pennsylvania, with pneumonia cited as the cause of death. He was survived by his third wife, the former Anne Gilbert, as well as three sons and three grandchildren. His marriages to opera soprano singer Phyllis Curtin and Patricia Romero both ended in divorce.

References

External links
 Philip Curtin - Daily Telegraph obituary
  - New York Times
  - Washington Post
  - JHU Gazette
  - H-NET

1922 births
2009 deaths
Swarthmore College alumni
Harvard Graduate School of Arts and Sciences alumni
20th-century American historians
20th-century American male writers
United States Merchant Mariners of World War II
Deaths from pneumonia in Pennsylvania
Johns Hopkins University faculty
MacArthur Fellows
People from Chester County, Pennsylvania
Writers from Philadelphia
People from Webster Springs, West Virginia
Presidents of the American Historical Association
Swarthmore College faculty
University of Wisconsin–Madison faculty
Historians from Pennsylvania
Historians of Africa
American Africanists
American male non-fiction writers
Members of the American Philosophical Society
Presidents of the African Studies Association